Take a Ride is the debut album by San Diego–based American rapper Jayo Felony. It was released on October 24, 1995 via Jam Master Jay's JMJ Records label and distributed by Rush Associated Labels, a PolyGram circulation of Def Jam Recordings. Audio production of the sixteen-track record was handled by Tony "T-Funk" Pearyer, Prodagee Productions, Marlin Wiggins, Randy Allen and Jam Master Jay, who also served as executive producers. The album peaked at number 65 on the Top R&B/Hip-Hop Albums chart.

Track listing

Notes
Track 2 contains samples from "T.A.P.O.A.F.O.M. (Fly Away)" by George Clinton and P-Funk All Stars (1996)
Track 6 contains samples from "Come Go With Me" by Teddy Pendergrass (1979)

Personnel

Aaron Reiss - mixing & recording (track 6)
Anthony Cox - guitar (track 10), mixing & recording (tracks: 7, 10, 14, 16)
Anthony "T-Funk" Pearyer - backing vocals & keyboards (track 10), producer (tracks: 7-8, 11, 14, 16)
James Savage - main artist, producer (track 6)
Jason William Mizell - executive producer, producer (tracks: 3, 6-7, 10-11, 14, 16)
Kenneth "Bull" Davis - backing vocals (track 6)
Kevin Goins - backing vocals (track 7)
Marlin Wiggins - producer (tracks: 3-4, 9)
Nate Motlety - producer (tracks: 4, 9), mixing (tracks: 2-4, 9, 13)
Randy Allen - executive producer, producer (tracks: 1, 5, 8, 12, 15)
Robert Ulsh - recording (tracks: 2-4, 9, 13)
Tamika Dash - backing vocals (track 16)
Tim Clark - mixing (tracks: 2-3, 9, 13)
Tony Dawsey - mastering
Victor "Wyse" Sturdivant - drums (track 7)

References

1995 debut albums
Jayo Felony albums
JMJ Records albums
Def Jam Recordings albums